Juan Andrade Heymann (Quito, December 18, 1945) is an Ecuadorian writer, novelist, short story writer, poet, and playwright.

His short story El lagarto en la mano (1965) and his novel Las tertulias de San Li Tun (1993) expressed social change.

Works

References 

1945 births
People from Quito
Ecuadorian male short story writers
Ecuadorian short story writers
Ecuadorian male writers
Ecuadorian dramatists and playwrights
Living people
Male dramatists and playwrights